Bernardo Sabatini may refer to:

 Bernardo L. Sabatini, American neuroscientist
 Bernardo Sabadini (died 1718), Italian opera composer